This is a list of data breaches,  using data compiled from various sources, including press reports, government news releases, and mainstream news articles. The list includes those involving the theft or compromise of 30,000 or more records, although many smaller breaches occur continually. Breaches of large organizations where the number of records is still unknown are also listed. In addition, the various methods used in the breaches are listed, with hacking being the most common.

Most reported breaches are in North America, at least in part because of relatively strict disclosure laws in North American countries. It is estimated that the average cost of a data breach will be over $150 million by 2020, with the global annual cost forecast to be $2.1 trillion. As a result of data breaches, it is estimated that in first half of 2018 alone, about 4.5 billion records were exposed. In 2019, a collection of 2.7 billion identity records, consisting of 774 million unique email addresses and 21 million unique passwords, was posted on the web for sale.

References

Sources

Data security

Data breaches in the United States
Internet privacy
Internet vigilantism
Cyberattacks on energy sector
Cyberwarfare

data breaches